The discography of American rapper Trina consists of six studio albums, four EPs, eleven mixtapes and 23 singles. Trina made her debut in spring 2000 with the single "Da Baddest Bitch", which reached the top forty in the United States and topped the US R&B charts. Her debut album, Da Baddest Bitch, was released on March 21, 2000, and debuted at eleven on Top R&B/Hip-Hop Albums. By November 2000, the album had sold 700,000 and was certified Gold by the RIAA. The album also featured the singles "Da Baddest Bitch" and "Pull Over".

Trina has released the songs "B R Right", which landed at number eighty-three on the Hot 100, and "Here We Go" featuring Kelly Rowland, which became a top 20 hit in the United States and outside the country and was certified Gold by the RIAA. Trina has released five albums, being one of the only female rappers to do so.

Trina released her fifth album, Amazin', on May 4, 2010. It featured the singles "That's My Attitude", which peaked at number 10 on the Bubbling Under R&B/Hip-Hop Singles chart, "Million Dollar Girl", and "Always", which peaked at forty-two on US R&B charts and "White Girl", which failed to chart.

On July 24, 2013, Trina released a single titled "A$$ Fat", featuring Meek Mill.

In her career, Trina has achieved a gold-certified album, Da Baddest Bitch, and a gold-certified single, "Here We Go".

Albums

Studio albums

Extended plays

Mixtapes

Singles

As lead artist

As featured artist

Promotional singles

Guest appearances

Music videos

DVDs

References

Hip hop discographies
Discographies of American artists